The Dean Edge is a series of similar bass guitars produced by Dean Guitars. The Edge is usually produced with rosewood neck and solid basswood bodies, with the exception of the E09M, which is made of mahogany. Another feature is the pair of "Soapbar" pick-ups wired in parallel. A very distinguishing feature of the Edge is the asymmetrical head stock design and the lack of a pickguard. The number of strings varies from four to ten. Dean Edges are used in countless music genres, and are especially popular among jazz players, such as bass virtuoso Jeff Berlin as well as, multi-instrumentalist Happy Tom

Versions

Edge
Edge 1
Edge 1 Quilt Top
Edge 1-5
Edge 4
Edge 5
Edge 6
Edge 8
E09
E09M
Playmate E09
Edge Fretless
Edge Pro
Edge Hammer
Edge Hammer 10
Edge Q
Edge Q4 Bartolini
Edge Q6

Users of Edges
Chas Cronk of Strawbs
Elena Luciano of Imagika
Jamareo Artis of Nu
Jeremy Ryan Plato of Cross Canadian Ragweed
Randy Berg of Analog Digital Disorder
Banner Thomas of Molly Hatchet
Dink Cook of Toby Keith
Hermes Limòn of ArtriD-X
Happy Tom: Happy Tom
Sar/Lou of Evangelyne

External links
Official website

Edge